"Waste a Moment"  is a song by American rock band Kings of Leon. The song was released as a digital download on September 9, 2016 through RCA Records as the lead single from their seventh studio album Walls (2016). The song was written by Caleb Followill, Nathan Followill, Jared Followill and Matthew Followill.

Music video
A music video to accompany the release of "Waste a Moment" was first released onto YouTube on September 13, 2016.

Commercial performance
"Waste a Moment" is the band's fifth single (and their first since 2010's "Radioactive") to reach number one on Billboard Alternative Songs chart, charting for a total of 27 weeks. "Waste a Moment" also tied the record for the second longest #1 Adult Alternative Songs on the Billboard charts alongside Clocks by remaining at number one for fifteen non-consecutive weeks. It has also become the band's highest-charting single on the Mainstream Rock Songs chart, peaking at number 15, besting "Supersoaker"'s number 22 showing in 2013.

Track listing

Chart performance

Weekly charts

Year-end charts

Certifications

References

2016 songs
2016 singles
Kings of Leon songs
Songs written by Caleb Followill
Songs written by Jared Followill
Songs written by Matthew Followill
Songs written by Nathan Followill